Nigga Please (stylized as N☆☆★A PLeASe) is the second solo studio album by American rapper and Wu-Tang Clan member Ol' Dirty Bastard. It was released on September 14, 1999 via Elektra Records. Recording sessions took place at Quad Recording Studios, at Chung King Studios and at 36 Chambers Studio in New York City, and at American Studios in Los Angeles. Production was handled by RZA, The Neptunes, Irv Gotti, Buddha Monk, Dat Nigga Reb, DL, Flavahood Productions, Mr. Fingers and True Master. It features guest appearances from 12 O'Clock, Kelis, La the Darkman, Lil' Mo, Pharrell Williams, Raison the Zukeeper, Shorty Shit Stain, and comedian Chris Rock.

In the United States, the album debuted at number 10 on the Billboard 200 and number two on the Top R&B/Hip-Hop Albums with 93,000 copies sold in the first week. It was certified Gold by the Recording Industry Association of America on December 6, 1999. The album also peaked at number 59 in Germany and number 64 in the Netherlands.

Its lead single, "Got Your Money", peaked at #11 in the UK, #33 in the US, #82 in France, #96 in the Netherlands, and was certified Silver by the British Phonographic Industry. The music video for "Got Your Money" was directed by Hype Williams.

It was the last album to be released in ODB's lifetime before his death on November 13, 2004 due to complications of a drug overdose.

Album name
Before its release Ol' Dirty Bastard announced multiple title possibilities for the album, including God Made Dirt and Dirt Don't Hurt and The Black Man Is God, White Man Is the Devil. In a 1997 interview with MTV, which went unreleased until 2015, he said that the album might be called Dirty's World.

Track listing

Sample credits
Track 2 contains excerpts from "Theme From T. J. Hooker" by Mark Snow
Track 3 contains interpolations from the composition "Cold Blooded" by Rick James
Track 4 contains samples from "Children's Story" by Slick Rick and "Nigga Please" from Dolemite
Track 6 contains samples from "You Turn Me On" by Labelle
Track 10 contains samples from "You've Made Me So Very Happy" by Blood, Sweat & Tears
Track 12 contains samples from "65 Bars and a Taste of Soul" by Charles Wright & the Watts 103rd Street Rhythm Band
Track 13 contains samples from "Group Introduction" by The Emotions

Charts

Weekly charts

Year-end charts

Certifications

References

External links

1999 albums
Albums produced by RZA
Elektra Records albums
Ol' Dirty Bastard albums
Albums produced by Irv Gotti
Albums produced by True Master
Albums produced by the Neptunes
Albums recorded at Chung King Studios